The 170th Group is a unit of the Nebraska Air National Guard, stationed at Offutt Air Force Base, Nebraska. If activated to federal service, the group would be gained by the United States Air Force Air Combat Command.

The group was originally activated in the New Jersey Air National Guard as the 170th Air Transport Group, a strategic airlift unit in 1964.  It served in various airlift roles until 1977 when it was redesignated the 170th Air Refueling Group and performed the air refueling mission until it was inactivated in 1993 when the Air National Guard adopted the Air Force's Objective wing organization.

Mission
The 170th Group (170 GP) grew out of Detachment 1 of Headquarters Nebraska Air National Guard, which was established in June 2002. It gathers members of the Nebraska Air National Guard stationed at Offutt Air Force Base into a single administrative unit as part of the "Future Total Force Initiative."  Through this initiative, Guard instructor aircrew integrate with the 338th Combat Training Squadron (338 CTS) to provide initial qualification, requalification and upgrade training to active duty USAF and Air National Guard aircrew members in the RC-135 RIVET JOINT, COMBAT SENT and COBRA BALL aircraft and the E-4B NIGHTWATCH aircraft.  These instructors are assigned to the 238th Combat Training Squadron.

Likewise, Guardsmen integrate into the 55th Operations Support Squadron (55 OSS) to support the global operations of the 55th Wing (55 WG), providing training and operational support to the active duty wing's global command and control and intelligence missions. Areas supported include requirements, weapons and tactics, intelligence, base operations, weather, and aviation resource management. These Guardsment form the 170th Operations Support Squadron (170 OSS). Overall, the 170th Group is authorized 80 personnel, including 35 full-time and 45 traditional Guardsmen.

The 170th was reactivated in a ceremony on 6 July 2007 at Offutt Air Force Base.

History
The group was first activated at Newark Municipal Airport on 18 January 1964 as the 170th Air Transport Group to provide a headquarters for the 150th Air Transport Squadron and its supporting units.  The group initially operated Lockheed C-121 Constellation long-distance transports, primarily for passenger movements to Europe.   Eighteen months after its formation, the group moved to McGuire Air Force Base.

The 170th also flew to the Caribbean and, during the Vietnam War, to Japan, Thailand, South Vietnam, Australia and the Philippines.  In 1966, when Military Airlift Command replaced Military Air Transport Service, the group became the 170th Military Airlift Group.  From 1969 the group focused on airlifting patients, and became the 170th Aeromedical Airlift Group.

The Constellations were retired in 1973, and were replaced with de Havilland Canada C-7 Caribou light transports, which were returning from service in the Vietnam War.  The C-7s were used for carrying small payloads in forward areas with unimproved airstrips.

In 1977 the 170th received Boeing KC-135 Stratotankers and became the 150th Air Refueling Squadron.  On 1 October 1993, the 170th Air Refueling Group was combined with the 108th Air Refueling Wing at McGuire when the New Jersey Air National Guard implemented the Air Force's Objective Wing organization, which called for all units on a base to be assigned to a single wing. The group was inactivated while its 150th Air Refueling Squadron was assigned to the 108th Operations Group as its second KC-135 squadron.

In 2007, the group was activated as the 170th Group at Offutt Air Force Base, Nebraska to unify Air National Guard support for the 55th Wing.

Lineage
 Established as the 170th Air Transport Group, Heavy and allotted to the Air National Guard on 16 December 1963
 Activated and extended federal recognition and activated, 18 January 1964
 Redesignated 170th Military Airlift Group on 1 January 1966
 Redesignated 170th Aeromedical Airlift Group c. 1 December 1969
 Redesignated 170th Tactical Airlift Groupon 9 June 1973
 Redesignated 170th Air Refueling Group, Heavy on 1 April 1977
 Inactivated on: 30 September 1993
 Withdrawn from New Jersey and allotted to Nebraska on 1 July 2007
 Activated and extended federal recognition on 7 July 2007

Assignments
 New Jersey Air National Guard, 18 January 1964
 133d Air Transport Wing, March 1964
 171st Military Airlift Wing (later 171st Aeromedical Airlift Wing), 1 January 1966
 118th Tactical Airlift Wing, 9 June 1973
 171st Air Refueling Wing, 1 April 1977
 108th Air Refueling Wing, c. October 1991 – 1 October 1993
 Nebraska Air National Guard, 7 July 2007 – Present

 Mobilization gaining commands
 Military Air Transport Service, 18 January 1964
 Military Airlift Command, 1 January 1966
 Strategic Air Command 1 April 1977 – 1 June 1992
 Air Combat Command, 1 June 1992 – 1 October 1993
 Air Combat Command, 7 July 2007

Components
 150th Air Transport Squadron (later 150th Military Airlift Squadron, 150th Aeromedical Airlift Squadron, 150th Tactical Airlift Squadron, 150th Air Refueling Squadron), 18 January 1964 – 30 September 1993
 170th Operations Support Squadron, 7 July 2007 – present
 238th Combat Training Squadron, 7 July 2007 – present

Stations
 Newark Municipal Airport, New Jersey, 18 January 1964
 McGuire Air Force Base, New Jersey, 1 July 1965 – 30 September 1993
 Offutt Air Force Base, Nebraska, 7 July 2007 – Present

Aircraft

 Lockheed C-121 Constellation, 1964-1973
 de Havilland Canada C-7 Caribou, 1973-1977
 Convair C-131 Samaritan, 1977 (1 VIP Aircraft)

 Boeing KC-135 Stratotanker, 1977-1993

Awards

References

Notes

Citations

Bibliography

 

Groups of the United States Air National Guard
Military units and formations in Nebraska
Military units and formations in New Jersey